William Daro Bean (born May 11, 1964) is an American former professional baseball player. He played in Major League Baseball (MLB) as an outfielder for the Detroit Tigers (1987–1989), Los Angeles Dodgers (1989), and San Diego Padres (1993–1995), as well as the Kintetsu Buffaloes of Nippon Professional Baseball (NPB) in 1992.
 In July 2014, he was named MLB's first Ambassador for Inclusion. In January 2016 he became MLB's Vice President, Ambassador for Inclusion and is currently Senior Vice President and Special Assistant to the Commissioner.

Early life
Bean's father, Bill Bean, began dating 18 year old Linda Robertson while they were classmates at Santa Ana High School in Santa Ana, California. The couple married while Linda was pregnant, then separated when Billy was six months old. Linda married Ed Kovac, a police officer, and they had five children together.

Playing career
Bean attended Santa Ana High School, and won a state championship with the school's baseball team. He enrolled at Loyola Marymount University on an athletic scholarship to play college baseball for the Loyola Marymount Lions. After his junior year, the New York Yankees selected Bean in the 24th round of the 1985 MLB Draft. Though the Yankees offered Bean a $55,000 signing bonus, Bean followed through with his promise to return to Loyola Marymount for his senior year. Bean appeared with the Lions in the 1986 College World Series.

The Detroit Tigers selected Bean in the fourth round of the 1986 MLB Draft. He signed with the Tigers for $12,500. Bean made his major league debut for the Tigers on April 24, 1987. He spent most of the 1988 season in the minor leagues, where he led the Toledo Mud Hens in batting average; however, he played in 10 games for the Tigers after he was promoted in August 1988. He played in nine games for the Tigers in the 1989 season. On July 17, 1989, the Tigers traded Bean to the Los Angeles Dodgers for minor leaguers Steve Green and Domingo Michel. He batted .197 for the Dodgers in 51 games, and was demoted to the minor leagues.

Bean played in Minor League Baseball during the 1990 and 1991 seasons. He played for the Kintetsu Buffaloes of Nippon Professional Baseball in 1992. Bean signed a minor league contract with the San Diego Padres before the 1993 season, and was promoted back to the major leagues. He batted .260 in 88 games for the Padres in 1993, and .215 in 84 games for the Padres in 1994. After playing for the Padres in 1995, Bean opted to retire from baseball after the 1995 season.

Personal life
Billy Bean married his college sweetheart when he was 24-years-old. He left the marriage four years later after meeting his partner Sam, an Iranian immigrant who was raised in Austria. Sam later died of HIV-related causes the day before Bean's final MLB season. Bean did not attend the funeral. 

Bean came out as gay to his parents in 1998. He came out publicly to Lydia Martin of the Miami Herald in 1999, becoming the second Major League Baseball player to publicly come out as gay;  Glenn Burke was the first to come out to his teammates and employers during his playing days but did not come out to the public at large until his career was over.

After leaving baseball, Bean moved to Miami Beach, Florida to be with his partner Efrain Veiga, the founder of Yuca restaurant in Miami. Bean and Veiga were together for thirteen years, breaking up in July 2008.

In 2003, Bean released a memoir titled Going the Other Way: Lessons from a Life in and out of Major League Baseball.

Bean was appointed MLB's first "Ambassador for Inclusion" on July 15, 2014. In this role, Bean counseled David Denson, who became the first minor league player signed to an MLB organization to come out as gay.

Bean is married to his husband Greg, a doctor. They live in New York City.

Television appearances
Bean was a panelist on GSN's I've Got a Secret revival in 2006, and is a board member of the Gay and Lesbian Athletics Foundation. He appeared in a 2009 episode of Kathy Griffin: My Life on the D-List, showing Griffin several homes.

In the summer of 2007, it was announced that he had been hired as a consultant by Scout Productions, the team of David Collins and Michael Williams, who produced Bravo's Queer Eye for the Straight Guy, for their next project with Showtime entitled The Beard. The project was to be a romantic comedy about a gay professional baseball player who enters into a relationship with a woman in order to survive in the sports world; Showtime did not go forward with the series.

Bean starred in a MTV episode of Made, he was an actor in an episode of the sitcom Frasier and appeared as himself on the HBO series Arli$$ in the 2002 episode "Playing it Safe".

On June 3, 2022, Bean was on a Sportsnet LA television broadcast of the Dodger's pregame show for Pride Night, in his role as MLB's Ambassador for Inclusion. When Bean mentioned Glenn Burke, the first out gay man in MLB history, whose career was cut short by the Dodgers and other teams because of his orientation, the broadcast cut away. It went back for a moment as Bean could be heard saying "[Burke's] ending was not a happy one," and cut to commercial. The broadcast did not go back to Bean again.

References

External links

1964 births
Living people
Albuquerque Dukes players
American expatriate baseball players in Canada
American expatriate baseball players in Japan
Baseball players from California
Detroit Tigers players
Edmonton Trappers players
Gay sportsmen
Glens Falls Tigers players
Kintetsu Buffaloes players
Las Vegas Stars (baseball) players
Leones del Caracas players
LGBT baseball players
LGBT people from California
LGBT people from Florida
American LGBT sportspeople
Los Angeles Dodgers players
Loyola Marymount Lions baseball players
Major League Baseball outfielders
Navegantes del Magallanes players
American expatriate baseball players in Venezuela
Nippon Professional Baseball outfielders
San Diego Padres players
Baseball players from Miami
Sportspeople from Santa Ana, California
Toledo Mud Hens players
21st-century American LGBT people
Alaska Goldpanners of Fairbanks players